The Malaysia Valke was a professional rugby union team based in Kuala Lumpur that played in the Global Rapid Rugby competition. The team was formed in 2019 as a joint venture between Malaysia Rugby and the Falcons Rugby Union of South Africa, but was disbanded a year later after the incomplete 2020 season was cancelled due to the COVID-19 pandemic.

The team was scheduled to play three matches in 2020 at the Bukit Jalil National Stadium in Kuala Lumpur and two matches at Stadium TUDM on the Subang base of the Royal Malaysian Air Force (RMAF or in Malay, TUDM: Tentera Udara Diraja Malaysia). However, after season was suspended due to the coronavirus pandemic, the team's home games were not able to be played.

The Malaysia Valke ultimately played only two matches before being disbanded. These were away games to the Western Force in Perth in 2019 and 2020.

Personnel
The Malaysia Valke team was predominantly made up of South African players and staff but also included members of the Malaysia national team and players from other nations.

Head coaches
 JP Immelman (2019)
 Rudy Joubert (2020)
 Team Manager: Ben Ibrahim (2019 & 2020)

Captains
 Shane Kirkwood (2019)
 Andries Truter (2020)

Squads
2020 Global Rapid Rugby     

  Robey Leibrandt
  Tian van der Merwe

  Qhama Hina
  Lux Koza
  Primo Ncube
  Heinrich Roelfse

  Jacques Alberts
  Andrew Volschenk

  Cody Basson
  Thabo Mabuza
  Vince Maruping
  Friedle Olivier
  Dwayne Pienaar
  Conway Pretorius
  Samuel Rentap Meran
  Boela Venter

  Zee Empangeni
  Johan Pretotius
  Anrich Richter

  Amirul Aqil
  Divan Nel

  Andries Truter (c)
  Andrew van Wyk
  Valentino Wellman

  Ezrick Alexander
  Coert Cronje
  Roro Damons
  Anwarul Hafiz Ahmad
  Marc Lee
  Badrul Muktee
  Hardus Pretorius

  Errol Jaggers 

Notes:     
  

Bold denotes player is internationally capped.

See also
Rugby union in Malaysia

References

External links

Malaysian rugby union teams
Global Rapid Rugby teams
Rugby clubs established in 2019
Defunct rugby union teams
Rugby union clubs disestablished in 2020